Guido Vandone (18 February 1930 – 31 July 2019) was an Italian professional footballer who played as a goalkeeper for Torino, Savona, Prato, Lecce and Cuneo.

References

1930 births
2019 deaths
Italian footballers
Torino F.C. players
Savona F.B.C. players
A.C. Prato players
U.S. Lecce players
A.C. Cuneo 1905 players
Serie A players
Serie C players
Serie D players
Association football goalkeepers